Jonathan Hacker is an electrical engineer at Teledyne Scientific and Imaging in Thousand Oaks, California, and was named Teledyne's Technologist of the Year in 2011. Hacker was named a Fellow of the Institute of Electrical and Electronics Engineers (IEEE) in 2015 for his contributions to terahertz integrated circuits and devices.

References 

Fellow Members of the IEEE
Living people
Year of birth missing (living people)
American electrical engineers